Memphis Express (The Express) were an American soccer team, founded in 2002. The team was a member of the United Soccer Leagues Premier Development League (PDL), the fourth tier of the American Soccer Pyramid, until 2005, when the team left the league and the franchise was terminated.

The Express played their home games in the stadium on the grounds of Collierville High School in Collierville, Tennessee, 31 miles east  of downtown Memphis. The team's colors were white, purple and black.

Year-by-year

Honors
 USL PDL Southern Conference Champions 2003
 USL PDL Mid-South Division Champions 2002

Competition history

Coaches
  Toni Carbognani 2002–05

Stadia
 Mike Rose Soccer Complex, Memphis, Tennessee 2003
 Stadium at Collierville High School, Collierville, Tennessee 2004–05

Average attendance

E
Soccer clubs in Tennessee
Defunct Premier Development League teams
2002 establishments in Tennessee
2005 disestablishments in Tennessee
Association football clubs established in 2002
Association football clubs disestablished in 2005
Collierville, Tennessee